Whitcomb's Rangers were authorized on October 15, 1776, and formed in November 1776 at Fort Ticonderoga in New York. The unit consisted of two companies of New Hampshire rangers for service with the Continental Army under the command of Benjamin Whitcomb, a veteran of Bedel's Regiment. They saw action at the Battle of Hubbardton, Battle of Bennington and the Battle of Saratoga. They were disbanded on January 1, 1781 at Coos, New Hampshire.

References
 State Builders: An Illustrated Historical and Biographical Record of the State of New Hampshire. State Builders Publishing Manchester, NH 1903

External links
Bibliography of the Continental Army in New Hampshire compiled by the United States Army Center of Military History

Military units and formations established in 1776
New Hampshire regiments of the Continental Army
United States Army Rangers
Military units and formations disestablished in 1781
1776 establishments in New York (state)